Benitochromis is a small  genus of cichlid fishes that are endemic to riverine and lake habitats in Middle Africa (Cameroon and Equatorial Guinea, including the island of Bioko). Several of these species were originally assigned to the genus Chromidotilapia. The name of this genus is derived from the type locality of the Benito River in Equatorial Guinea compounded with chromis, a word which originated with Aristotle and which may derive from the Greek word chroemo, meaning "to neigh" and which may have originally referred to the drums of the family Sciaenidae and which was expanded to include cichlids, damselfishes, dottybacks and wrasses, groups of perch-like fish which were thought to be more closely related to each other than they are subsequent studies have apparently found them to be.

Species
There are currently six recognized species in this genus:
 Benitochromis batesii (Boulenger, 1901)	  
 Benitochromis conjunctus Lamboj, 2001	  
 Benitochromis finleyi (Trewavas, 1974)	  
 Benitochromis nigrodorsalis Lamboj, 2001	  
 Benitochromis riomuniensis (Thys van den Audenaerde, 1981)
 Benitochromis ufermanni Lamboj, 2001

References

Chromidotilapiini
Fish of Africa
Cichlid genera